Kārlis Vērdiņš (born July 28, 1979 in Riga) is a Latvian poet.

Biography 
Vērdiņš grew up in Jelgava. He studied for his B.A. and M.A. in Cultural Theory at the Latvian Academy of Culture. In 2009 he received his Ph.D. in Philology from the University of Latvia. Since 2007 he has worked for the Institute of Literature, Folklore and Art, at the University of Latvia.

Writing 
Vērdiņš is the author of many academic papers and essays on literature, both in Latvian and other languages. He is also a literary critic. He has published four volumes of poetry in Latvian - "Ledlauži" (Icebreakers, 2001, 2nd edition 2009), "Biezpiens ar krējumu" (Cottage Cheese with Sour Cream, 2004), "Es" (I, 2008) and "Pieaugušie" (Adults, 2015) as well as a children's book, "Burtiņu zupa" (Alphabet Soup, 2007).

Vērdiņš has also written librettos and song lyrics for composers such as Ēriks Ešenvalds, Andris Dzenītis, Gabriel Jackson, Kārlis Lācis, and has published translations of W. B. Yeats, T. S. Eliot, Joseph Brodsky, Walt Whitman, Charles Simic, Georg Trakl, Lev Rubinstein, Jacek Dehnel, Konstantin Biebl, Emily Dickinson and other authors. His own poetry has been translated in many languages: "Titry" (translated by Semen Khanin, in Russian, 2003), "Niosłem ci kanapeczkę" (translated by Jacek Dehnel, in Polish, 2009), "Já" (translated by Pavel Štoll, in Czech, 2013) and "Come to Me" (translated by Ieva Lešinska, in English, 2015).

His monograph "The Social and Political Dimensions of the Latvian Prose Poem" was published by Pisa University Press in 2010.

Vērdiņš has received prizes from the annual poetry festival in Latvia (2008) and from the newspaper "Diena" (2001 and 2008), as well as the annual Literature prize for best children's book of the year (2007). In 2012, he represented Latvia at the Poetry Parnassus festival – part of the Cultural Olympiad in London. His poem "Come to Me" was included in the list of the fifty greatest modern love poems, chosen by poetry specialists at the London's Southbank Centre in 2014.

A selection of Vērdiņš' poems, translated into English, was published by Arc Publications in 2015. When reviewing this book the poet and critic Gregory Woods wrote, "his first person is singularly hard to pin down, apparently detached while involved, precise while vague, inventing stuff while accurately recording memory. The voices he adopts comment wryly on a world in which nothing could surprise us, even while everything takes our breath away. The reader finds she has to check the ground beneath her feet."

References 

1979 births
Living people
Writers from Riga
People from Jelgava
Latvian male poets
21st-century Latvian poets
21st-century male writers
21st-century Latvian writers
University of Latvia alumni
Latvian Academy of Culture alumni